Pryanik (Czech and Slovak: perník;) refers to a range of traditional sweet-baked goods in Russia, Belarus and some neighboring countries such as in Poland and the Baltics. It is also a popular Czech and Slovak sweet. 

Traditionally, pryaniks are made from flour and honey. While some Russian-English dictionaries translate pryanik as gingerbread, ginger is an optional pryanik ingredient, unlike honey. Sugar is often used instead of honey in industrial pryaniki production and modern home-cooking.
Related to pryanik is kovrizhka (коврижка), sweet bread with similar ingredients.

The word pryanik is from Old East Slavic пьпьрянъ, an adjective from Old East Slavic пьпьрь 'pepper', which makes it etymologically similar or related to German Pfefferkuchen. In Germany, ginger was added to Christmas or Easter cookies - this is how the first gingerbread, or "lebkuchen", appeared.  In France, the inventor of gingerbread is considered to be Gregory of Nikopol, who in 992 allegedly moved to this country from Armenia and taught the local monks this recipe.

See also
 Gingerbread
 Lebkuchen

References

External links

Russian desserts
Ukrainian desserts
Belarusian desserts
Baked goods
Confectionery